Matthew Phillip Carbon (born 8 June 1975) is an English footballer who played as a centre-back.

Biography

Matt Carbon is Head of Football at Sports Gateway after retiring from professional football in 2007-08.

Carbon was born in Nottingham. Until the end of the 2007–08 season, he played for Milton Keynes Dons. Prior to that, he played for the New Zealand Knights in the A-League in Australia. He has previously played in the English Premiership for Derby County and the English First Division for West Bromwich Albion and Walsall, alongside spells in lower divisions.

Carbon started his career with Lincoln City in the lower English league, before signing for Derby County F.C. in 1996 in a £385,000 deal. Carbon helped Derby win promotion to the Premier League and contributed to Derby's impressive mid-table finish in 1996–97, playing twelve times. Carbon made a further four appearances in 1997–98, before sealing an £800,000 move to First Division side West Brom. Carbon became a regular during his time at The Hawthorns, making over 100 league appearances before his free transfer move to Walsall in 2001. Over fifty league appearances were made for the Saddlers, with a free transfer to Barnsley also bringing 50 games and a goal against Port Vale. In 2006, Carbon moved to the A-League to play for New Zealand Knights but never featured, spending only one game on the bench before being released. He signed for Milton Keynes on an initial two-month deal on 4 December 2007 before retiring.

Carbon played four times for the England under-21 side.

References

External links
 
Unofficial Matt Carbon Profile at The Forgotten Imp
England profile at The FA

Living people
1975 births
Footballers from Nottingham
Association football central defenders
English footballers
Lincoln City F.C. players
New Zealand Knights FC players
Barnsley F.C. players
West Bromwich Albion F.C. players
Walsall F.C. players
Derby County F.C. players
Milton Keynes Dons F.C. players
Expatriate association footballers in New Zealand
Premier League players
English expatriate sportspeople in New Zealand
English expatriate footballers